Harrington Talents is a film production company located in the City Island area of the Bronx. The company was founded by three childhood friends: Frank Mosca serves as the company's head producer, Stephen Franciosa Jr. works as the director, chief editor, and technical director, and John Morena works as a creative director and art designer.

Projects

2009
 Archive
 Blood Night: The Legend of Mary Hatchet
 Before I Self Destruct

2008
 The Road
 Ibanker
 Comedy Jump Off: The Latino Explosion
 Dough Boys
 B.S.I
 Straight Outta Puerto Rico: Reggaeton's Rough Road to Glory

2007
 Dance on the Planet
 Comedy Jump Off: The Latino Invasion
 Super Slice
 WhiteBoyz in the Hood
 Seekers

2006
 Comedy Jump Off: The Latino Connection
 Even Steven
 Legends Never Die
 "T&T Today"
 "Whiteboyz in the Hood"
 The Making of 'Press Play'''
 Making the Band 32005
 Life's Decisions Ape to Man2003
 Jin: Making of a Rap Star2002
 It's Gotta Start SomewhereSpot On
Spot On is a commercial production division of Harrington Talents. It was established in 2009 as the influx of demand for commercial, industrial, and viral productions rose for Harrington. Owners Frank Mosca and Stephen Franciosa Jr. felt it necessary to establish a subsidiary that solely dealt with commercial and promotional production.

Spot On projectsLarry The Cable Guy: A Sleeve is a Terrible Thing to Waste was done for the History Channel to promote of Larry's show Only in America with Larry the Cable Guy.
HCG Platinum with Carmen Electra was an infomercial done for the weight loss supplement.
In 2011, Spot On worked on a public service announcement (PSA) entitled Not Acceptable'' done for the Spread the Word to End the Word campaign. It was a controversial treatment that advocated removing the word "retard" from use as a personal description. It shows people of many backgrounds expressing the unacceptable nature behind many derogatory words. The spot culminates with Jane Lynch and Lauren Potter of Fox Television's GLEE imploring everyone to remove the word from everyday language. It has garnered support from the Special Olympics, Best Buddies, the NAACP, the Anti Defamation League, GLAAD, and many other organizations.

Awards and nominations

References

External links
 
 Spot On

Film production companies of the United States